Passing Clouds railway station is a railway station on the Daylesford line, in the locality of Musk, in Central Victoria, Australia. It was opened on 19 July 2018. It serves the adjacent Passing Clouds winery which is within walking distance from the station. It is serviced by the tourist services operated by the Daylesford Spa Country Railway.

The station consists of a short gravel platform and a Weatherboard waiting shelter.

References

Victoria (Australia) tourist railway stations